Guillermo Díaz (born March 4, 1985) is a Puerto Rican professional basketball player who plays for Cangrejeros de Santurce of the Baloncesto Superior Nacional (BSN). Díaz was drafted by the Los Angeles Clippers of the National Basketball Association (NBA) in 2006, becoming the fifth Puerto Rican ever drafted by the NBA and the eighth to play there. He has also played professionally in Europe and in Puerto Rico.

Biography

University of Miami
Diaz had a stellar college career at the University of Miami, where he earned All-American status. At the University of Miami, he finished 10th on the school's all-time scoring list with 1,477 points, including 174 three-point field goals. He garnered All-Big East Team Freshman First Team honors in 2003–04 and led Miami in scoring as both a sophomore and a junior. He was named to the All-ACC Team in both his sophomore and junior years.

Los Angeles Clippers
Diaz declared his eligibility for the NBA draft following his junior year and was selected by the Los Angeles Clippers, with the 52nd overall selection in the 2006 NBA Draft. During the summers of 2006 and 2007, Diaz participated with the team in the NBA Summer Pro League.

On August 16, 2007, Diaz signed a non-guaranteed contract with the Los Angeles Clippers to 3 years $2 million, according to HOOPSHYPE.com. On October 25, Diaz was released at the conclusion of preseason, signing a free agent contract with the Anaheim Arsenal of the NBDL. Through January 8, 2008, Diaz averaged 16.6 points per game in 14 games, with 7 starts.

On January 8, 2008, Diaz was signed to a 10-day contract with the Clippers, in which he debuted against the Phoenix Suns playing 5 minutes and registering 1 rebound. On January 18, the Clippers extended his contract for an additional 10 days. Through 6 games played in the NBA, Diaz scored 5 points, grabbed 2 rebounds, and dished 1 assist in 18 minutes played. The contract was terminated on January 28, when the team decided not to offer a guaranteed contract for the remainder of the season.

NBA Summer League 2008
Guillermo Diaz was included on the Summer League roster of the Charlotte Bobcats for the NBA Summer League 2008.

Overseas career
For the 2006–07 season he played for ČEZ Basketball Nymburk in the Czech basketball league. On January 7, 2007, El Nuevo Dia reported that Diaz would not return for the second half of the season, as stated by mentor Arturo Alvarez, as Diaz wasn't able to adapt to the different lifestyle that he experienced in the Czech Republic. By the time that Diaz decided to leave the Czech league, he was the second leading scorer in the whole league, with an average of 20.1 points per game, and had led Nymburk to a 15–1 season start in the Czech League.

Diaz also played in five games with AEP Olimpiada Patron in the Greek League in 2007, tallying 13.0 points per game.

In February 2008, he signed for Pepsi Caserta, a team in the LegADue, now known as Serie A2 Basket, the second division of Italian professional basketball. He helped them win the championship in the 2008 season. For winning they were promoted to the Italian top-tier level LBA in the 2008–09 season.

Controversy with National Superior Basketball
After his departing from the Czech national league, Diaz announced that he was interested in including his name to the list of players in the Puerto Rican BSN draft. He was involved in a movement that was trying to convince the team owners of the league to avoid the implementation of a salary cap to first-year players.

However, the team owners decided to put in cap on salary of twenty five thousand dollars, which led Diaz to remove his name from the list of players. This led former owner Miguel Mercado to create a movement inciting first-year players to withdraw their names from the draft; the controversy reached a conclusion, when Mercado and the league reached an agreement. Diaz announced that he was going to skip participation in any league, and continued his participation in the Clippers Summer League team.

Real Estelí
Diaz played with Nicaraguan club Real Estelí in the 2021–22 BCL Americas.

Career stats

Domestic leagues

NBA

Source

Regular season

|-
| style="text-align:left;"|
| style="text-align:left;"|L.A. Clippers
| 6 || 0 || 3.0 || .250 || .000 || .600 || .3 || .2 || .0 || .0 || .8

 NCAA Division I: 93 games, 1477 points (15.9 PPG), 238 assists (2.6), 313 rebounds (3.4), 123 steals (1.3), .448 field goal percentage, .740 free-throw, and .380 3-point.

See also

 List of Puerto Ricans

References

External links

The Miami Herald's report on Diaz
Diaz's stats in the Czech Basketball League
El Nuevo Dia report about Diaz's controversy with the Puerto Rican Superior league 
NBAdraft.net profile

1985 births
Living people
2010 FIBA World Championship players
Puerto Rican expatriate basketball people in the Czech Republic
Puerto Rican expatriate basketball people in Nicaragua 
Puerto Rican expatriate basketball people in Greece
Puerto Rican expatriate basketball people in Italy
Anaheim Arsenal players
Atléticos de San Germán players
Capitanes de Arecibo players
Basketball Nymburk players
Greek Basket League players
Juvecaserta Basket players
Los Angeles Clippers draft picks
Los Angeles Clippers players
Miami Hurricanes men's basketball players
National Basketball Association players from Puerto Rico
Olympias Patras B.C. players
Pallacanestro Biella players
Point guards
Real Estelí Baloncesto players
Puerto Rican men's basketball players
San Lorenzo de Almagro (basketball) players
Sportspeople from San Juan, Puerto Rico
Victoria Libertas Pallacanestro players